The Lake County Lakers was a franchise in the International Basketball League, that played home games in Lake County, Illinois.

The team, was owned by Shawn Chism, who also served as the team's General Manager

Former Venues
College of Lake County, Grayslake
Grayslake North High School, Grayslake
Lakes Community High School, Lake Villa
Trinity International University, Deerfield
Waukegan High School, Waukegan
Woodland School, Gurnee

Lake County, Illinois
Defunct basketball teams in the United States